Aarundivide Chodikkan is a 1986 Indian Malayalam film, directed by Manoj Babu.  The film has musical score by A. T. Ummer.

Soundtrack
The music was composed by A. T. Ummer and the lyrics were written by Poovachal Khader.

References

External links
 

1986 films
1980s Malayalam-language films